Großharras is a town in the district of Mistelbach in the Austrian state of Lower Austria.

Geography
The area comprises the cadastral communities of Diepolz, Großharras and Zwingendorf.

Population

References

Cities and towns in Mistelbach District